Harishchandra Sakharam Bhatavdekar (15 March 1868 – 20 February 1958), also known as Save dada, was the first Indian to make a film (motion picture) in India.

Biography
H. S. Bhatavdekar was a resident of Mumbai (Bombay). A Maharashtrian portrait photographer by occupation, Bhatavdekar was one of the first witnesses to the Lumiere Brothers film show in 1896 in Mumbai. He soon acquired a movie camera from London and a projector and went on to make some films on day-to-day life of the city as also some important events. His family name was changed to Save and his descendants live in Yari Road, Mumbai. One of his descendants is named Tvisha Save living in Andheri West, Mumbai. His great-grandson, Aditya Save founded Agilio Labs and his great-granddaughter-in law Ananya founded Felicita Foods and The Little House Versova. They have a son who was born in 2007. H.S.'s grandson also acted in many plays free of cost.

Filmmaking career
"The Wrestlers" was shot during a wrestling match in Mumbai and was the first film to be shot by an Indian.

H. S. Bhatavdekar's later films also were all reality films, with  "Local Scenes...", "Sir Wrangler..." and "Delhi Darbar..." being of historical significance; since important personalities like R. P. Paranjpe can be seen landing in India from a ship; and the proceedings of the Delhi Durbar (Delhi Royal Court). Bhatavdekar also filmed Lord Curzon at the coronation of King Edward VII in Kolkata (Calcutta) in 1903. Bhatavdekar can be considered the first documentary filmmaker of India, with his films India's first newsreels.

Filmography
(as a director)
 The Wrestlers (1899)
 A man and his monkeys (1899)
 Local Scenes: Landing of M. M. Bhownuggree (1901)
 Atash Behram (1901)
 Sir Wrangler Mr. R. P. Paranjpe (1901)
 Delhi Durbar of Lord Curzon (1903)
 Delhi Durbar (1903/I)

References

External links
 

1868 births
1958 deaths
Film directors from Mumbai
Indian documentary filmmakers
20th-century Indian film directors
19th-century Indian film directors
Indian silent film directors